This is a list of law enforcement officers convicted for an on-duty killing in the United States. The listing documents the date the incident resulting in conviction occurred, the date the officer(s) was convicted, the name of the officer(s), and a brief description of the original occurrence making no implications regarding wrongdoing or justification on the part of the person killed or officer involved.

List

See also

References 

Death in the United States-related lists
Killings by law enforcement officers in the United States
United States law-related lists
Lists of killings by law enforcement officers